Uroplakin-3a (UP3a) is a protein that in humans is encoded by the UPK3A gene.  

UP3a is found in the inner membrane of the urinary bladder and contributes to the strength of that membrane and to the membrane's ability to stretch when the bladder is full.  It is also found in the renal pelvis, ureter, and prostatic urethra.

References

Further reading

Uroplakins